Arthur Wallace Peach (1886–1956) was an American poet, the first English chair at Norwich University, and the director of the Vermont Historical Society. His poetry has been covered extensively in scholarly sources, and have been published in many poetry collections.

References

American poets
20th-century American historians
20th-century American male writers
20th-century American educators
1886 births
1956 deaths
American male non-fiction writers